Paul Jedrasiak (born 6 February 1993) is a French rugby union player. His position is Lock and he currently plays for Clermont Auvergne in the Top 14.	
He was named in the French squad for the 2016 Six Nations Championship, and made his debut on 6 February against Italy.

References

External links
 

1993 births
Living people
French rugby union players
ASM Clermont Auvergne players
Rugby union locks
France international rugby union players
People from Montluçon
Sportspeople from Allier